Hopea wyattsmithii is a tree in the family Dipterocarpaceae, native to Borneo. It is named for the botanist John Wyatt-Smith.

Description
It has flying (detached) buttresses and stilt roots. The bark is smooth.

Distribution and habitat
Hopea wyattsmithii is endemic to Borneo.

Conservation
Hopea wyattsmithii has been assessed as near threatened on the IUCN Red List. It is threatened by conversion of land for plantations and agriculture. In Sarawak, the species is also threatened by the building of a hydroelectric dam. The species is found in some protected areas.

References

wyattsmithii
Endemic flora of Borneo
Plants described in 1962